"Some Days Are Diamonds (Some Days Are Stone)" is a song written by Deena Kaye Rose and quite different from the humorous and novelty songs for which she is best known. Rose recorded the song in 1976, but the original version failed to chart. 

The song was covered by multiple artist including Bobby Bare and John Denver. Denver's version, released on the 1981 album Some Days Are Diamonds, was the album's first single. Denver's version peaked at number 6 on the Billboard Hot Country Singles chart and number 36 on the Billboard Hot 100. It also reached number one on the RPM Country Tracks chart in Canada.

Content
John Denver changed the actual lyrics from “some days are coal,” to “some days are stone” under pressure from the coal industry - a major employer in West Virginia. In a 2016 interview with Outtake Media, writer Deena Kaye Rose stated that she wrote the song about her struggles with genderidentity prior to her own coming out as a trans woman. She stated that she felt that, being in the music industry, she often had to hide her desired identity from the music community, and respectively used the images of diamonds and stone to reflect her feminine and masculine sides.

Charts

Notes

References

1976 songs
1981 singles
John Denver songs
Songs written by Deena Kaye Rose
Bobby Bare songs
LGBT-related songs